The Haryana legislative assembly election, 2005 was held on 3 February 2005, to select the 90 members of the Haryana Legislative Assembly. Results were declared on 27 February 2005. Indian National Congress got 67 seats and form government.

Results
The results were declared on 27 February 2005.

Elected members

References

2005
2005
Haryana